Harcum College is a private associate degree-granting college in Bryn Mawr, Pennsylvania. It was founded in 1915 and was the first college in Pennsylvania authorized to grant associate degrees.

History
Edith Hatcher, daughter of prominent Virginia clergyman and educator William E. Hatcher, was a talented concert pianist. In 1913, Edith Hatcher married Octavius Marvin Harcum. After the birth of their first child, Edith wrote "the concert career did not offer a chance for family stability" so they chose a venture that would combine "my talents as an educator and artist and his business vision and ability."

They opened the Harcum Post Graduate School on October 1, 1915, in Melville Hall with three students and five pianos. Edith's goal was to "start a school where the individual talent of each girl would be treated as an integral part of her education." Though her expertise was in the fine arts, Edith was also committed to providing a strong academic program.

In its early years, Harcum was a university preparatory school, giving students the skills needed for college study. It quickly grew, soon adding junior college-level courses. Mr. Harcum, or "Uncle Marvin" as the students called him, was the first President. When he died in a car accident in 1920, Edith assumed the Presidency. She remained in that post for more than 30 years.

Leadership was eventually assumed by Philip Klein and Henry Klein. In 1956, Pennsylvania granted Harcum permission to be the first junior college in the Commonwealth's history to confer the Associate of Arts and the Associate of Science degrees. Tremendous building and expansion occurred in the 1960s with the addition of the Academic Center, Pennswood Hall, and Klein Hall. Historically a women's college, Harcum began admitting male students during the 1970s and became officially co-educational in 2003.

Today, Harcum serves traditional and non-traditional students interested in Allied Health Science, Business and Human Services, with both a commuter and residential experience. Henry Klein served on Harcum's board of trustees for more than 50 years, holding the record for the longest serving board member at any university or college in the United States of America.

Academics

Harcum College offers over 20 degree programs in fields like Allied Health Science, Business, Human Services, Design, and Education. Non-credit courses, certificate programs, and professional development programs are offered through the Office of Continuing Studies. Courses are offered at Harcum's Bryn Mawr campus, at partnership sites, and online.

Campus
Harcum's main campus is in Bryn Mawr on the Philadelphia Main Line.

The campus is in the municipality of Lower Merion Township, and in the Bryn Mawr census-designated place.

The main campus buildings stretch along Montgomery Avenue, including the historic Melville Hall, Klein Hall, Bedford Hall, The Academic Center (which includes Harcum's Library), historic Richter Hall and Pennswood Hall — the college's main residence hall.

Also on campus is the college's Cohen Dental Center, a 16-chair clinical facility which houses the Dental Clinic, Dental Laboratory, and classrooms.

The Veterinary Services building houses the Animal Care Facility which services the AVMA accredited Veterinary Technology program.

The Harcum Music School was founded in 1985 when Medley Music of Bryn Mawr transferred ownership of their teaching division to Harcum College. The school officially moved to Harcum's Bryn Mawr campus in 1990. The Harcum Music School is open to Harcum students as well as community members who wish to learn a musical instrument, take intermediate or advanced lessons, collaborate with other musicians, or play in front of a live audience.

The Kevin D. Marlo Little Theatre—named after Kevin D. Marlo, son of Harcum Trustee Dennis Marlo and an aspiring actor and who was killed during the September 11th attacks on the World Trade Center—is an historic theatre that was restored and revived in 2011 in an effort to reconnect students and community to the arts.

The campus is connected to center city Philadelphia by the Paoli/Thorndale Line of Regional Rail.

Athletics

Harcum offers men and women's basketball and indoor and outdoor track & field as well as women's volleyball and men and women's soccer.

The athletic teams are members of the National Junior College Athletic Association.

The college's official mascot is "Hatcher the Bear", named after founder Edith Hatcher Harcum.

References

External links
Official website

 
Educational institutions established in 1915
Garden State Athletic Conference
Lower Merion Township, Pennsylvania
Universities and colleges in Montgomery County, Pennsylvania
1915 establishments in Pennsylvania
Philadelphia Main Line
NJCAA athletics
Private universities and colleges in Pennsylvania